Jānis Silarājs (born 3 May 1976) is a Latvian bobsledder. He competed in the four man event at the 2002 Winter Olympics.

References

External links
 

1976 births
Living people
Latvian male bobsledders
Olympic bobsledders of Latvia
Bobsledders at the 2002 Winter Olympics
Sportspeople from Riga